Canadian Reflections is a Canadian independent short film television series which began on CBC Television in 1978.

Premise
This series features independent Canadian short films of various styles and topics, including both original works and theatrical short films that have previously screened on the film festival circuit. In the early years, the films were compiled by Athan Katsos.

Scheduling
As of August 2010, this half-hour series is broadcast on Mondays (immediately following Sunday evenings) at midnight, or 12:30 a.m. Newfoundland time. It has aired in various time slots since its debut on 10 June 1978. In its initial years, it was broadcast weekly in mid-year between television seasons. In 1982, it was broadcast one to five times per week, normally on weekday afternoons.

References

External links
 Canadian Reflections at the Canadian Broadcasting Corporation

CBC Television original programming
1978 Canadian television series debuts
Canadian late-night television programming
Canadian motion picture television series